Wen-chin Ouyang,  is a professor of Arabic literature and comparative literature at SOAS, University of London.

Early life and education
Ouyang was born in Taiwan and raised in Libya. She earned her bachelor's degree in the Arabic language from the University of Tripoli and completed her PhD in Middle Eastern studies at Columbia University in the United States. She taught Arabic studies at Columbia, the University of Chicago and the University of Virginia before moving to the United Kingdom. Ouyang speaks both Arabic and Mandarin Chinese as a native speaker.

Career
Most of Ouyang's written work focuses on early to middle Arabic literary criticism. She is the editor or co-editor of several academic journals within the field of Middle Eastern studies. She is also a regular contributor to Banipal. During the early 2000s, Ouyang was one of the organizers for a workshop series based on the "Genre, narrative and ideology" research program at SOAS.

In 2013, Ouyang was selected as a judge for the 2015 Man Booker International Prize.

In July 2018, Ouyang was elected a Fellow of the British Academy (FBA), the United Kingdom's national academy for the humanities and social sciences. She was the first Taiwan-born academic to receive the honour.

In 2022 she was elected to the Academia Sinica.

References

External links
Official bio page at the SOAS website
Wen-chin Ouyang at Alibris

Living people
Taiwanese women academics
University of Tripoli alumni
Columbia University alumni
University of Chicago faculty
University of Virginia faculty
Academic journal editors
Taiwanese women editors
Middle Eastern studies scholars
Taiwanese Arabists
Taiwanese orientalists
Academics of SOAS University of London
Fellows of the British Academy
Women orientalists
Year of birth missing (living people)
Taiwanese expatriates in Libya
Members of Academia Sinica